Psydrus piceus is a species of beetle in the family Carabidae, the only species in the genus Psydrus.

References

Psydrinae
Monotypic Carabidae genera